The Linen Quarter is a vibrant area of Belfast city centre. The name is derived from the great many linen warehouses that are still present in the area. The Linen Quarter is host to some of the major cultural venues of Belfast, including the Ulster Hall and Grand Opera House, alongside a large number of hotels, bars, restaurants and cafes. The district also includes the main transport hub of Belfast.

The linen trade that used to dominate this part of the city has now been replaced by  international consultancy firms and many technology start ups. Belfast City Council and a number of central government departments are also headquartered in the Linen Quarter, giving the area a distinct character. The vibrancy of the Linen Quarter is supported by the Linen Quarter Business Improvement District, which is a democratically elected body that also promotes the area and helps co-ordinate improvements across the district.

Geography of the Linen Quarter

The Linen Quarter is the area of Belfast city centre south of the City Hall. Traditionally the district was understood to occupy an approximate square shaped area bounded by Howard Street/Donegall Square South/May Street, Great Victoria Street, Ormeau Avenue and Joy Street. Since the formation of Linen Quarter BID in 2018, however, the district is often considered to have a wider footprint that includes the Europa Transport Hub and parts of Dublin Road.

History of the Linen Quarter

The area now occupied by the Linen Quarter today was marshy land that was part of the estuary where the river Blackstaff flowed into the Lagan. The only habitable grounds directly south of the 17th century city were the sandbanks on the western high water mark of this estuary, where the principal thoroughfare leading south towards Lisburn, and ultimately, Dublin was established. This old route can still be recognised as today's Sandy Row. The only noticeable development in this area was the paper mill that was established along the river Blackstaff by the Joy family. It occupied the ground around the eastern end of today's Ormeau Avenue and is remembered through the name of Joy Street to this day.

This situation persisted well into the 18th century, when the former castle gardens of Belfast Castle (burned down in 1708) were developed into a new city quarter with Donegall Place and the White Linen Hall (completed in 1788) at its heart. Consequently, Linen hall street was opened behind the White Linen Hall and soon other streets followed, including Dublin Road in 1809 and Great Victoria Street in 1823.

The established of the Gasworks by the Lagan river and the opening of the railway station at Great Victoria Street in the 1820s helped fuel the remarkable growth of this part of Belfast. This included the establishment of new bars (e.g. the Railway Tavern - now known as the Crown Bar) and places of entertainment. After a new mechanised linen industry emerged (originally set up by the Mulholland family in their Linen mills in York Street in the 1820s), the area gradually became the centre of the linen trade, with offices and warehouses for major Linen companies built south of the White Linen Hall congregating around Bedford Street. The economic importance of the linen trade for the city is acknowledged in the nickname of  "Linenopolis" that was assigned to Belfast during the industrial era.

Many of the linen warehouses dating back to this period still survive in the Linen Quarter to this day, such as Ewart's buildings (named after William Ewart and Sons, one of the world's leading linen manufacturers), Bryson House, Yorkshire House (built by the Jaffe Brothers, another one of Europe's leading linen firms), Armagh House, and Tyrone House, which once housed the Franklin Steam Laundry. Most of these have now been converted into new office premises or apartments.

With some downturns and recoveries along the way the linen industry survived until the Second World War. But after that, rising costs, new synthetic materials and foreign competition saw it collapse.  With the outbreak of civil unrest during the period from 1970 onwards, better known as ‘the Troubles’, the area experienced further decline and became semi-derelict for decades.

After the signing of the 1998 Good Friday Agreement, renewed investment kick-started a 21st-century economic revival in Northern Ireland in general, and in the Linen Quarter in particular.

Regeneration of the Linen Quarter

Today, the Linen Quarter is leading the way in adjusting Belfast's economy to the 21st century. Housed in the historic Ormeau Baths, the Tech Hub was opened in 2017 to help drive Belfast's nascent high tech industry by providing a co-operative networking centre for tech start-up companies. The district has also seen the transformation of its many linen warehouses into swanky new offices that have attracted a number of international firms to the area. Currently there are various large scale office blocks planned for the district, including the Bedford Square development and the redevelopment of the Movie House site on Dublin Road that is to house the Kainos international headquarters.

The building of the £50 million Grand Central Hotel by the Hastings Hotel Group confirmed the Linen Quarter as the heart of Belfast's hotel scene. Named for the city's most notable historic hotel, which was located on the site of the CastleCourt shopping centre on Royal Avenue, the Grand Central Hotel in Bedford Street is comfortably the biggest hotel ever built in the city. Other recently opened hotels in the area include the Maldron, Hampton by Hilton and the Etap Hotel, while forthcoming hotels include the George Best Hotel on the corner of Bedford Street and Donegall Square South

BBC will continue to contribute to the vibrancy of the district by planning a £77 million regeneration of its existing Broadcasting House site on Ormeau Avenue. Meanwhile, a major restoration of the Grand Opera House, costing £11 million, is due to begin in 2020 ahead of the theatre's 125th anniversary later that year.

In 2022, the new £200 million Belfast Transport Hub is scheduled to open. Named Weavers Cross, a name inspired by the linen heritage of the area, it will boost twenty-six bus stands and eight train platforms and will serve as the arrival station for the Dublin to Belfast Enterprise service. The project will also include a large leisure, residential and commercial development.

Transport links will also be boosted by a new north–south Glider route that will see a number of stops located within the Linen Quarter. Linking in to these infrastructure projects, the Streets Ahead V public realm improvement scheme will provide improved pedestrian environments between Donegal Square South and Shaftesbury Square.

Hospitality and entertainment

The hospitality business of the Linen Quarter has its origins linked to the development of the railway system. In the first half of the 19th century, inns offering food and lodging sprang up around the newly opened Great Victoria Street terminus. In 1839 The Ulster Railway Tavern opens in Great Victoria Street (refurbished and renamed Crown Liquor Saloon in 1888), while virtually next door, the Dublin and Armagh Hotel opened (now Robinsons). Across Amelia Street from the Crown was the Downshire Arms Hotel and its site is now occupied by Brennan's Bar.

The Linen Quarter continues to house a substantial proportion of Belfast's hotel industry. The Europa, owned by the Hastings Group and built on the site of the old Great Victoria Street Terminus, is probably the most famous Belfast hotel today. It has hosted some of the world's famous people, including presidents and film and music stars. Other iconic hotels in the district include the Fitzwilliam Hotel in Great Victoria Street, Grand Central Hotel in Bedford Street, and the Ten Square Hotel in Donegall Square South. 

The Linen Quarter has also been at the heart of Belfast's entertainment scene since the 19th century. Completed in 1862 as a grand ballroom, the Ulster Hall became one of the largest music halls in the British Isles. It has hosted a range of artists including include Count John McCormack, Paul Robeson, Caruso, Edward Elgar, Sir Thomas Beecham, Sidney Bechet, the Rolling Stones, U2 and Rory Gallagher.

The 19th century was also a boom period for the circus in Belfast, and many were staged in the Linen Quarter. The Grand Opera House was opened in 1895 as the ‘Cirque and Grand Opera House’ and presented several circuses. Since its opening it has hosted many of the world's greatest entertainers, including Laurel and Hardy, Sir Henry Irving and Ellen Terry, Gracie Fields, Sarah Bernhardt and Luciano Pavarotti, who made his UK debut there.

The BBC has been an integral part of the Linen Quarter since it made its first Northern Irish broadcast on 15 September 1924 from its first studio located in Linenhall Street. BBC's new Northern Ireland headquarters in Ormeau Avenue (Broadcasting House) were completed in 1939.

The Linen Quarter continues to host two of the city's historic venues, alongside other popular music venues such as the Limelight, and some of the most famous pubs in the UK or Ireland such as the Crown Liquor Saloon, which is evidenced by its reputation as one of the most instagrammed landmarks in the UK. The bar is particularly renowned for its ten atmospheric snugs or booths which come with match-striking plates, an antique bell system to summon staff, and beautifully decorated mirrors. The Observatory bar in the Grand Central Hotel is the highest built bar in Ireland, and there are several bars that are renowned for their offering of live Irish music such as The Points and Fibber Maggee's. Other well known bars include Pug Uglys, The Perch and Sweet Afton.

The Linen Quarter hosts a wide variety of acclaimed restaurants and cafés, and includes award-winning establishments such as James St., owned by Niall McKenna, who appeared on the BBC TV series Great British Menu. The Michelin starred Deanes EIPIC is run by Michael Deane, who has led the restaurant revolution in Northern Ireland since opening his first restaurant in 1993. Other restaurants in the district offer cuisines ranging from Japanese fusion to traditional Irish and include Zen (Asian fusion), Nu Delhi (Indian), Red Panda (Chinese) and Fratelli's (Italian).

Transport

The Belfast Hub area has long been at the heart of transport in the city, linking Belfast with the rest of the island.  After plans for the Ulster Railway were announced in 1835, Belfast joined the railway revolution in 1839, when the first section from Belfast to Lisburn was opened for passenger traffic.  A fitting railway terminus was built on Great Victoria Street and opened in 1848. The completion of the Dublin and Belfast Junction Railway made Victoria Street, soon known as ‘Great Victoria Street’, the terminus for one of the most important main lines in Ireland. Over the next decades commuter traffic to from neighbouring towns to Belfast grew rapidly.

One of the main modes of urban transport was the horse-drawn tram, introduced by the Belfast Street Tramway Company From 1872. In the early 1900s, the network was electrified to make this form of transport more affordable. Buses were introduced by Belfast Corporation (Belfast City Council) in 1926, initially to supplement the tram service, but gradually replacing them. The last tram ran in 1954 and the last trolleybus in 1968.

During the 1960s much of the original terminal at Great Victoria Street was demolished to make way for the development of the Europa Hotel and a bus station. However, in 1995 a second Great Victoria Street Station opened just yards from the site of its predecessor. Following the success of this station, a new enlarged Transport Hub is planned to replace both the existing bus station and railway station.

Business and innovation

Innovation was crucial to the industrial and manufacturing boom that swept through the city from the late Victorian to Edwardian era and to the development of the Linen Quarter. Initially, it was Belfast's cotton industry that drew thousands in from the surrounding countryside. Innovative mechanized methods of production were adopted that allowed the dramatic rise of Ireland's mechanised linen industry. Several companies rose to global prominence by continuing this process of industrial pioneering.

Andrew Mulholland, who donated the Ulster Hall's magnificent organ, oversaw a company that built the world's largest and one of its most advanced linen mills. Daniel Jaffe, one of the pioneers of linen in Belfast, had his Irish base at what is now the Ten Square Hotel, while Ewarts, one of the world's greatest linen manufacturers, had a large establishment in Bedford Street.

Innovation still remains a vital part of the Linen Quarter's business community today. Arup, for example, are a community of collaborators that bring together a range of disciplines such as transport systems, energy, water management, urban design, architecture, and climate change. Several leading financial institutions, like Cunningham Coates of Linenhall Street, have also made the Linen Quarter their home. The district is currently attracting to various start-ups and established companies in the web design and tech sectors.

Art and architecture of the Linen Quarter

Grand Opera House, Great Victoria Street

The Grand Opera House was constructed in 1894–5 to designs by Frank Matcham, the leading theatre designer of his day. The theatre was expected to accommodate opera, variety, pantomime and circus and could be adapted to fulfil the varying requirements of each type of entertainment. The Grand Opera House was declared open on 16 December 1895, a week before the opening performance, a pantomime called ‘Blue Beard’.

Ulster Hall, Bedford Street

The Ulster Hall is a two-storey Italianate entertainment hall with double-height auditorium that is prominently located on Bedford Street in Belfast city centre. It was completed in 1862 to the designs and under the supervision of William Joseph Barre. A source of immense civic pride on its opening, the building was a sign of Belfast's growing maturity as a town and an acknowledgement among its industrious merchants of the importance of ‘relaxation, pleasure and enjoyment’.

Joseph Carey's Belfast scenes

In 1902, Belfast City Council commissioned the local artist Joseph W. Carey to produce thirteen scenes from Belfast history on canvas, to be mounted within the Ulster Hall. The scenes depict the city and the surrounding area, incorporating historical and mythological influences. The paintings were restored in 1989 and again in 2009.

Ewart’s Buildings

This three storey sandstone building was built for the Bedford Street Weaving Company by James Hamilton of Glasgow in 1869. It was extended by James Ewart in 1883 and again, to the rear, in 1937 (though this was later demolished). In 1876 it was purchased by William Ewart and Son, one of the world's leading linen manufacturers who owned mills, warehouses and offices throughout Belfast and beyond.

Broadcasting House, Ormeau Avenue

The six-storey multi-bay modernist BBC Broadcasting House was completed in 1939 to the designs of architect James Millar and features a distinctive steel framed, polychromatic brick building. Broadcasting House replaced the BBC's earlier premises on Linenhall Street which it had occupied since the creation of the first regional station in the 1920s.

Ormeau Baths, Ormeau Avenue

This beautiful Victorian building began life as the public baths for the South Belfast area. Designed by Robert Watt, it opened in the late 1880s. For many local people whose houses lacked sanitation it was a godsend, not least for those working in industry. The Queen Anne Style red brick building contained both individual baths and a swimming pool and, with its sister establishments in the rest of Belfast, greatly improved hygiene in the city.

The Thomas Thompson Memorial Fountain, Ormeau Avenue

This fountain is located on the intersection of Bedford Street and Ormeau Avenue, facing the BBC offices. It was erected as a special memorial to Ex-naval surgeon Thomas Thompson, one of Belfast's pioneers in the fight against cholera, who also founded the Belfast's Charitable Home for the Incurables. The monument was commissioned by his daughter Eliza and designed by Young and MacKenzie, the preeminent Belfast architectural firm of the time.

St Malachy’s, Alfred Street

One of the most famous, and beautiful, churches in Belfast, St Malachy's, was completed in 1844. It is designed in the ecclesiastical style of the Tudor period by Thomas Jackson. The church's vaulted ceiling, described as ‘an upside down wedding cake’, was inspired by the Henry VII chapel in Westminster Abbey. In 2009 a multi-million pound restoration included the renovation of the ceiling and the cleaning of the beautiful stained glass windows.

Monument to the Unknown Woman Worker, Great Victoria Street

The Monument to the Unknown Woman Worker is a 1992 bronze sculpture by Louise Walsh and is located adjacent to the Europa Hotel. It features two working-class women with symbols of women's work and domestic items such as colanders, a shopping basket and clothes pegs part of the sculpture.

Notable events

In 1869 Charles Dickens read ‘A Christmas Carol’, ‘The Pickwick Papers’ and ‘David Copperfield’ at two separate readings at the Ulster Hall.

The Conservative Party in Ulster launched an anti-Home Rule campaign in February 1886. It joined with the Orange Order to organise a huge political rally in Ulster Hall at which Lord Randolph Churchill (father of Winston) gave a rousing speech that urged unionists to organise against Home Rule.

The BBC opened its first studio in Linenhall Street. Actor and broadcaster Tyrone Guthrie made the first broadcast here on 15 September 1924.

Led Zeppelin debuted with their song Stairway to Heaven at the Ulster Hall in 1971.

In 1978, the National Trust, purchased the Crown Liquor Saloon following a public campaign led by influential conservationists including Sir John Betjeman.

People associated with the Linen Quarter

Francis Joy (3 August 1697 – 10 June 1790) established Belfast's first paper mill along the Blackstaff River, on grounds near the eastern end of today's Ormeau Avenue. Joy was an entrepreneur who founded the Belfast News Letter in 1737 (thereby making it the oldest continuously running English language daily newspaper) and developed the family business to include papermaking due to a shortage of paper for his newsletters. Joy Street is named after him.

Andrew Mulholland (1791 – 24 August 1866) donated the organ to Ulster Hall in 1862. He was originally a cotton manufacturer who kick-started Belfast's world leading mechanised linen industry by establishing the first large-scale linen mill in York Street in 1830.

Sir William Ewart (22 November 1817 – 1 August 1889) was an Irish linen manufacturer based in the Ewart's Buildings on Bedford Street. He acted as president of the Irish Linen Trade Association and was elected as mayor of Belfast in 1859. Ewart also served as Member of Parliament (MP) between 1878 until his death in 1889.

Sir Otto Moses Jaffe (13 August 1846 – 29 April 1929) was a German-born British businessman who headed the family business ‘The Jaffe Brothers’ at Bedford Street (now the site of 10 Square Hotel) and managed to built it up to become the largest linen exporter in Ireland. He was elected Lord Mayor of Belfast twice due to his prominence and became the first Jewish Lord Mayor.

Frank Matcham  (22 November 1854 – 17 May 1920), who was the leading theatre designer during the UK theatre boom years at the end of the 19th century, was responsible for the design of Royal Opera House. During his 40-year career, he designed more than 90 theatres throughout the United Kingdom including the Hippodrome (1900), Hackney Empire (1901), London Coliseum (1903), London Palladium (1910), and the Victoria Palace (1911).

Sir William Tyrone Guthrie (2 July 1900 – 15 May 1971) voiced BBC Northern Ireland's first broadcast when it launched on 15 September 1924 from its studio located in Linenhall Street. He was an English theatrical director and broadcaster.

Ruby Florence Murray (29 March 1935 – 17 December 1996) performed in the Ulster hall. A singer and actress born near the Donegall Road in south Belfast, she toured as a child singer and went on to become one of UK's most popular singers during the 1950s.

Rory Gallagher (2 March 1948 – 14 June 1995) played multiple times in Ulster Hall during the Troubles, a time when other artists generally avoided touring in Northern Ireland. As an Irish blues and rock multi-instrumentalist, songwriter, and producer, Gallagher formed the band ‘Taste’ in the late 1960s before going on to produce solo albums.

See also
 Cathedral Quarter, Belfast

References

External links
Linen Hall Library

Quarters of Belfast